Pont de Levallois–Bécon is the northwestern terminus of Line 3 of the Paris Métro, located in the commune of Levallois-Perret.

Location
The station is located under Rue Anatole-France in Levallois-Perret, between Rue Baudin and Avenue Georges-Pompidou.

History
It was opened on 24 September 1937 when the line was extended from Porte de Champerret.

The station is named after the bridge linking Levallois-Perret and Courbevoie across the Seine, as well as the neighbourhood of Bécon in Courbevoie, directly across the river. All take their name from a property developer, Nicolas Eugène Levallois.

In 2018, 5,374,925 passengers entered this station, which places it in 78th position among the 302 metro stations for its usage.

Passenger services

Access
The station has four entrances by fixed stairs and by escalators at the intersection of Rue Anatole-France and Avenue Georges-Pompidou.

Station layout

Platforms
Pont de Levallois-Bécon has two platforms, one central and one side, serving three tracks: the central platform is served by the two tracks used for the departure of the trains while the side platform is served by the trains on arrival. The decoration is in the style used for most metro stations: the lighting canopies are white and rounded in the Gaudin style of the renouveau du métro of the 2000s, and the bevelled white ceramic tiles cover the walls, the vault, and the tunnel exits. The advertising frames are a honey colour faience and the name of the station is also faience. The seats are a Motte style white colour.

Bus connections
The station is served by lines 94, 167, 238 and 275 of the RATP Bus Network and at night, by lines N16 and N52 of the Noctilien bus network.

Gallery

References

Roland, Gérard (2003). Stations de métro. D’Abbesses à Wagram. Éditions Bonneton.

Paris Métro stations in Levallois-Perret
Railway stations in France opened in 1937
Articles containing video clips